Rasiguères is a commune in the Pyrénées-Orientales department in southern France.

Geography

Localisation 
Rasiguères is in the canton of La Vallée de l'Agly and in the arrondissement of Perpignan. It gained particular recognition in 1981 when the pianist, Dame Moura Lympany, who lived in the village, established the Festival of Music and Wine which ran successfully for several years.

Population

Sites of interest 
 A fine cave cooperative, Cellier de Trémoine
 A fortified tower from the 15th c. with remaining parts of ramparts.
 An old bridge from the 16th and 17th c. on the river Tournefort.
 The ruins of the Trémoine family castle with walls from the 13th c. and a tower from the 16th and 17th c.
 Ruins of the Castellas tower from the 12th and 13th c.
 The Saint John the Baptist Church from the 18th and 19th c.
 Remains of an old church near the Tournefort bridge.
 Various old stone sheds in the vineyards.

See also
Communes of the Pyrénées-Orientales department

References

Communes of Pyrénées-Orientales
Fenouillèdes